Marie-Octobre is a 1959 French film directed by Julien Duvivier, based on the eponymous novel by Jacques Robert. It is also known as Secret Meeting  The film was remade in 2008 by director Josée Dayan, starring Nathalie Baye.

Plot
A group of ex-resistance fighters are brought together by Marie-Octobre, the code name of Marie-Helene Dumoulin (Danielle Darrieux). The former members of the network have carried on with their lives after the war, but this evening they are going to have to live again a fateful night – the night their leader was killed. He had been betrayed, his name given to the Germans. The search for the traitor puts each personality in the spotlight – and also that of the killed leader, Castille.

Cast
 Danielle Darrieux as Marie-Helene Dumoulin
 Bernard Blier as Julien Simoneau, a lawyer
 Robert Dalban as Leon Blanchet, a locksmith
 Paul Frankeur as Lucien Marinval, a sales agent in Les Halles
 Daniel Ivernel as Robert Thibaud, a doctor
 Paul Meurisse as Francois Renaud-Picart, an industrialist
 Serge Reggiani as Antoine Rougier, a printer
 Jeanne Fusier-Gir as Victorine, governess
 Paul Guers as Père Yves Le Guen, a priest
 Noel Roquevert as Etienne Vandamme, a tax inspector
 Lino Ventura as Carlo Bernardi, a night club owner

Around the film
 On a very similar plot line, British filmmaker Michael McCarthy directed in 1957 The Traitor, also shown in the US with the title The Accursed, starring Donald Wolfit,  Anton Diffring and Christopher Lee.

References

External links
 
 

1959 films
French mystery drama films
Films directed by Julien Duvivier
Films about the French Resistance
1950s French-language films
1950s French films